The Telangana Mahila Viswavidyalayam, formerly Osmania University College for Women is a state university in Hyderabad, India. It was formerly a constituent women's college of Osmania University. The main building of this college, which was part of the British legacy in India, is a monument of great aesthetic, architectural and historical importance. Commissioned in 1803 for the British resident, J. A. Kirkpatrick, its builder Lt. Samuel Russell of the Madras Engineers, has produced a structure capable of rivaling the Governor's house in Kolcata.

History

The college started in 1924. In 1939, the college was shifted to Golden Threshold. It was moved to its present location belonging to James Achilles Kirkpatrick's mansion Koti Residency in 1949.

In 2022, the college was upgraded to a state university, called Telangana Mahila Viswavidyalayam. It has plans to start offering engineering courses.

Campus 
The campus is spread over 42 acres.

Academics

Women's College offers graduate and postgraduate courses for women.

Graduation ceremonies
XIVth Convocation of the College was held on 4 October 2018 at the college premises. It was presided by the Honourable Vice-president of India, Shri M. Venkaiah Naidu.

See also 
Education in India
Literacy in India
List of institutions of higher education in Telangana

References

External links

 Official site

Osmania University
Women's universities and colleges in Telangana
1924 establishments in India
Educational institutions established in 1924
Women's universities and colleges in Andhra Pradesh
Colleges affiliated to Osmania University